Hysterocladia corallocera is a moth of the Megalopygidae family. It was described by Felder in 1874. It is found in Venezuela and French Guiana.

The wingspan is about 21 mm. The body and wings are white and the mid- and fore-legs are mottled with black. The shaft of the antennae is crimson and the pectinations are ochreous.

References

Moths described in 1874
Megalopygidae